Derick Smith Thomson (Scottish Gaelic: Ruaraidh MacThòmais; 5 August 1921, Stornoway – 21 March 2012, Glasgow) was a Scottish poet, publisher, lexicographer, academic and writer. He was originally from Lewis, but spent much of his life in Glasgow, where he was Professor of Celtic at the University of Glasgow from 1963 to 1991. He is best known for setting up the publishing house Gairm, along with its magazine, which was the longest-running periodical ever to be written entirely in Gaelic, running for over fifty years under his editorship. Gairm has since ceased, and was replaced by Gath and then STEALL. He was an Honorary President of the Scottish Poetry Library, and a Fellow of the Royal Society of Edinburgh and the British Academy. In June 2007, he received an honorary degree from Glasgow University.

Life
Thomson was originally from Upper Bayble (Pabail Uarach) on Lewis, the same village that produced two other Gaelic writers of note, Iain Crichton Smith and Anne Frater. His parents, James Thomson and Christina Smith, were both primary school teachers.

Educated at the Nicolson Institute in Stornoway, he went on to the Universities of Aberdeen; Cambridge and Bangor University. He would later teach at Edinburgh, Glasgow and Aberdeen. He became Professor of Celtic at Glasgow in 1963, and retired in 1991. He was Chairman of the Gaelic Books Council 1968–91; President Scottish Gaelic Texts Society; former member of Scottish Arts Council and was the first recipient of the Ossian Prize in 1974. Professor Thomson was Chairman of the SNP's Gaelic Committee in the Seventies.

He is the author of numerous books including An Introduction to Gaelic Poetry, The Companion to Gaelic Poetry, European Poetry in Gaelic, and collections of Gaelic poetry, including his collected poems Creachadh na Clàrsaich (Plundering of the Harp/clarsach) which shared the Scottish Book of the Year Award in 1983. He also edited The Companion to Gaelic Scotland. His English-Gaelic dictionary came out in 1981, and was for many years the most practical reference of its kind. He has published seven collections of Gaelic poetry, with many English translations, including Meall Garbh/The Rugged Mountain (1995), Smeur an Dochais, etc.

His publications are many and varied, and include such seminal works as the Gaelic Sources of Macpherson's Ossian, An Introduction to Gaelic Poetry, The Companion to Gaelic Scotland (edited by him) and Gaelic Poetry in the Eighteenth Century; his contributions to Welsh studies are also noteworthy. No less important has been Professor Thomson's work for the promotion of Scottish Gaelic literature, not only, to take one example, as founder, editor and publisher of the quarterly Gairm since 1953. He was elected Fellow of the Academy in 1992 and gave last year's Rhys Lecture on Scottish Gaelic Traditional Songs from the Sixteenth to the Eighteenth Century. Thomson was also tireless in his support of other writers in Gaelic and helped bring to publications works such as 'Gaelic Verbs' by Colin B.D. Mark. Derick Thomson died in 2012, at the age of 90.

Positions held
Honorary President, Scottish Poetry Library
Professor of Celtic, University of Glasgow – 1963–1991
Chairman of the Gaelic Books Council
Fellow of the Royal Society of Edinburgh
Fellow of the British Academy

Publications
Poetry (own work):
An Dealbh Briste / The Broken Picture (1951)
Eadar Samhradh is Foghar / Between Summer and Autumn (1967)
An Rathad Cian / Far Road (1970) –  
Saora agus an Iolaire / Freedom and the Eagle (1977) –  
Creachadh na Clàrsaich: Collected Poems, 1940–80 (1982) –  
Meall Garbh: Rugged Mountain (1985) –  
Bàrdachd na Roinn Eòrpa an Gàidhlig (1990) –  
Smeur an Dòchais: The Bramble of Hope (1992) –  
Sùil air Fàire (Surveying the Horizon) (2007) – 

Poetry (anthologies):

An Introduction to Gaelic Poetry (1990) – 
Gaelic Poetry in the Eighteenth Century: A Bilingual Anthology (1993) –  
Alasdair MacMhaighstir Alasdair: Selected Poems (1996) – 

Various:

The Gaelic sources of Macpherson's "Ossian" (Aberdeen University studies series;no.130) (1952) 
Branwen Uerch Lyr: The Second of the Four Branches of the Mabinogi (Mediaeval & Modern Welsh) (1961) –  
Gaelic Learner's Handbook (1973) –  
Bith-Eòlas (Biology Textbook) (1976) –  
Gàidhlig ann an Albainn/ Gaelic in Scotland: Bilingual Examination of the Place of Gaelic in Scottish Life (1976) – 
New English-Gaelic Dictionary (1981) –  
Why Gaelic Matters (1984) –  
The Companion to Gaelic Scotland (1987) –  
Languages of Scotland: International Conference Proceedings: Gaelic and Scots in Harmony 2nd, 1988 (1990) – 

Co-author:

Edward Lhuyd in the Scottish Highlands (1963) 1699–1700 –  
Future of the Highlands (1968) – 
Combined Gaelic-English, English-Gaelic Dictionary (1982) – 
Minority Languages Today (1990) –  
MacDiarmid MS Anthology (1992) –  
Scotland O Gael an Lawlander (1996) – 

Recordings:

Nyvaigs (2000) Jennifer Margaret Barker, Composer's Recording Inc./New World Records, CRI862, NWCR862 (recitation of his own poem Geodha Air Chùl Na Grèine)

References

Academic articles and lectures available in open access 

Black, Ronald. “Sorley MacLean, Derick Thomson, and the Women Most Dangerous to Men,” The Bottle Imp 21: June 2017.
Dymock, Emma. "The Gaelic Poetry of Derick Thomson," video lecture (Association for Scottish Literary Studies, 2020), YouTube.
Meek, Donald E. "Appreciation of Professor Derick S. Thomson: funeral oration," Passages from Tiree (blog post).
Poncarová, Petra Johana. "Derick Thomson and the Ossian Controversy," Anglica 29:3 (2020).
Poncarová, Petra Johana. "Eadar Canaan is Garrabost (Between Canaan and Garrabost): Religion in Derick Thomson’s Lewis Poetry," Studies in Scottish Literature 46:1 (2020).

External links
 Scottish Poetry Library entry (bio, poems in English and Gaelic, bibliography)
 BBC Bio – Làrach nam Bàrd (bio, poems in Gaelic with commentary, recordings)
Derick Thomson website (in Gaelic)
 Audio clip: obituary and tributes to Thomson (in Gaelic)

1921 births
Celtic studies scholars
2012 deaths
People from the Isle of Lewis
20th-century Scottish Gaelic poets
20th-century Scottish historians
Alumni of the University of Aberdeen
Alumni of Emmanuel College, Cambridge
Academics of the University of Glasgow
Scottish Renaissance
Fellows of the British Academy
Fellows of the Royal Society of Edinburgh
Translators from Scottish Gaelic
People educated at the Nicolson Institute
Scottish male poets
20th-century British translators
20th-century British male writers